is a Japanese race car driver from Tokyo currently racing in Super GT.

Career

History 

He began karting at age 12 in 1996 and quickly moved through the ranks, becoming a part of Honda's Formula Dream Project. He moved to Europe in 1998 to compete in Formula Vauxhall. He then moved on to the Formula Ford European Championship and competed in the Formula Ford Festival, finishing seventh in 2000 and third in 2001. He then moved back to Asia to compete in Asian Formula 2000 and Formula Dream, where he finished second in his rookie season. He won the Formula Dream championship in his second year in 2003. Mutoh then moved to Japan Formula 3, finishing 9th and third in his two seasons there. In 2006, he drove in Formula Nippon and Super GT 500–class.

2007 

In 2007, Autobacs Racing Team Aguri (ARTA) announced that Mutoh had been signed to drive their new entry in the Indy Pro Series in a car prepared by Panther Racing, who had last competed in IPS in 2003, winning the championship with driver Mark Taylor. Mutoh captured his first win in Liberty Challenge Race 1 at the Indianapolis Motor Speedway road course on United States Grand Prix weekend.

On September 9, Mutoh made his Indy Racing League IndyCar Series debut with Panther Racing at Chicagoland Speedway in the Peak Antifreeze Indy 300 in the one-off entry #60 car, sponsored by the Formula Dream Project. Mutoh finished 8th and clocked the fastest lap of the race. On October 31, 2007 it was announced Mutoh would replace 2007 IndyCar Series champion Dario Franchitti at Andretti Green Racing in the team's full-time #27 IndyCar for 2008.

2008

Mutoh made his debut for Andretti Green Racing at Homestead-Miami Speedway in March and in May was the highest qualifying rookie for the 2008 Indianapolis 500. He finished 7th in the race, the second best finishing position for a Japanese driver in the history of the race.

Mutoh scored his best finish of his IndyCar Series career in June at the Iowa Speedway, finishing second to Dan Wheldon, setting a new mark for best IndyCar finish by a Japanese driver, surpassing the 3rd place of Tora Takagi at Texas Motor Speedway in 2003. He failed to finish higher than 6th in the remainder of the season, but beat transitional driver Justin Wilson to the Rookie of the Year title and 10th place overall in the series.

2010
Mutoh participated in the 2010 IndyCar Series season with Newman/Haas Racing. He finished 18th in the final point standings.

2011
Mutoh has been announced as an Aguri Suzuki Honda driver in the Super GT series in Japan for 2011, alongside Takashi Kobayashi.

On September 1, Mutoh confirmed he would be part of the 2011 Indy Japan: The Final race at Motegi to drive No. 17  for Sam Schmidt Motorsports/AFS Racing. Mutoh finished 19th on the lead lap.

Motorsports career results

Complete Formula Nippon/Super Formula results
(key)

Complete Super GT results

‡ Half points awarded as less than 75% of race distance was completed.

American open–wheel racing results
(key) (Races in bold indicate pole position)

Indy Lights

IndyCar Series 

 1 Run on same day.
 2 Non-points race.

 ** Podium (Non-win) indicates 2nd or 3rd place finishes.
 *** Top 10s (Non-podium) indicates 4th through 10th place finishes.

Indianapolis 500

References 

Mutoh moving quickly as Indy 500 rookie

External links 

 Hideki Mutoh official website
 Hideki Mutoh official Twitter
 IndyCar Driver Page

1982 births
Japanese racing drivers
Indianapolis 500 drivers
Indy Lights drivers
IndyCar Series drivers
Formula Nippon drivers
Super GT drivers
Japanese Formula 3 Championship drivers
Sportspeople from Tokyo
Living people
Formula Ford drivers
Super Formula drivers
Asian Le Mans Series drivers
Japanese IndyCar Series drivers
Nakajima Racing drivers
Dandelion Racing drivers
Mugen Motorsports drivers
Arrow McLaren SP drivers
Andretti Autosport drivers
Newman/Haas Racing drivers
AFS Racing drivers
Team Kunimitsu drivers
Team Aguri drivers
Panther Racing drivers